Betoota is a ghost town within the locality of Birdsville, in the Shire of Diamantina, in the Channel Country of Central West Queensland, Australia. The last permanent resident, Sigmund Remienko, died in 2004.

The town has been designated as Australia's smallest. The only facilities in Betoota are a racetrack, a dry weather airstrip and a cricket field.  Visitors are drawn to the town during the annual Simpson Desert Carnival which is held in September.

History
Karuwali (also known as Garuwali, Dieri) is a language of far western Queensland. The Karuwali language region includes the landscape within the local government boundaries of the Diamantina Shire Council, including the localities of Betoota and Haddon Corner.

The town was surveyed in 1887, but only three streets were ever named. The Betoota Hotel was constructed in the late 1880s and is the last remaining building in town outside the race track. The building is constructed of sandstone and has timber floors.

In 1885, the Queensland Government opened a customs post to collect a toll for stock travelling the stock route. Betoota was once a Cobb & Co change station.

In 1895, a police presence was established in the town as construction of a rabbit-proof fence in the region was attracting many "undesirable characters" to the town. A police station with a court was built in 1915 but was closed in 1930 because an inspection in 1928 found no-one had been taken into custody or placed before the court in more than five years.

The hotel operated until 1997, when its owner, Sigmund (Simon) Remienko, retired at 82 years of age. Originally from Poland, Remienko worked as a grader driver until he bought the Betoota Hotel in 1957. He owned it for 47 years, and was Betoota's sole resident until ill-health forced him to move. The hotel closed in October 1997. Remienko died in 2004.

In 2017, Robert Haken, a smash repairer from Logan, bought the long-defunct hotel from the couple Remienko had left it to. It was being restored, with the aim of reopening in time for the Betoota Races in August 2018. However, that goal was not achieved, "due to paperwork". The Betoota Hotel re-opened on 20 July 2020.

Status
The town is now deserted, except for tourists in the dry season.

Heritage listings
Betoota has a number of heritage-listed sites, including a protected area known as Burke and Wills "Plant Camp".

Appearances in Popular Culture and Media
The town's name has been used by the Australian satirical news website and digital media company, The Betoota Advocate (although the company is actually based in Sydney). It purports to be "Australia's oldest newspaper".

See also

 List of ghost towns
 The Betoota Advocate

References

 
Towns in Queensland
Ghost towns in Queensland
Populated places established in 1887
1887 establishments in Australia
Shire of Diamantina
Birdsville, Queensland